Heung-boo: The Revolutionist is a 2018 South Korean historical drama film directed by Cho Geun-hyun and starring Jung Woo, Kim Joo-hyuk, Jung Jin-young and Jung Hae-in. It is based on the Korean folk tale Heungbu and Nolbu.

Plot 
Set during the Joseon Dynasty, the film follows an author who writes a novel to find his lost brother. On his travels he encounters a nobleman, who enlightens him.

Cast

Main
Jung Woo as Heung-boo
Kim Joo-hyuk as Jo-hyuk
Jung Jin-young as Jo Hang-ri
Jung Hae-in as King Heonjong

Supporting
Kim Won-hae as Kim Eung-jib 
Jung Sang-hoon as Kim Sat-gat
Kwak Dong-yeon as Sheddong 
Kim Hyun-mok as Audience on street	
Song Wook-kyung as Jo Tak-soo
Oh Tae-kyung as Kim Doo-nam
Nam Il-woo as Prime minister
Kim Hak-ryong as Jo Hak-ryong
Kim Wan-sun as Queen Dowager
Lee Hyun-woong as Kim Hyeon-ong
Joo Young-ho as Jeong Yong-pil
 Gu Ja-geon as a citizen.

Special appearance
Jin Goo as Nolbu
Chun Woo-hee as Seon-chool
Kang Ha-neul as Park Dol-po

Production 
Principal photography began on May 11, 2017, and ended on August 18, 2017.

Release and reception
The VIP premiere for the film was held on February 12, 2018, with the participation of the main cast and invitees.

The film was released in South Korea on February 14, 2018.

In the first weekend of Korean Box Office, Heung-boo: The Revolutionist was ranked fourth and had sold 211,590 tickets. The film had earned  during the first five days since its release.

By the end of the February, the film was seen by 410,000 viewers.

References

External links
  
 

2018 films
2010s historical drama films
Films based on Korean myths and legends
Lotte Entertainment films
Films directed by Cho Geun-hyun
South Korean historical drama films
2010s South Korean films
2010s Korean-language films